McShann's Piano is an album by jazz pianist Jay McShann recorded in 1966 and released by the Capitol label.

Reception

The Allmusic review by Scott Yanow noted "Jay McShann's first recording in a decade (and first official full-length LP) is a fine showcase for the pianist, who takes vocals on three of the 11 selections. ... Throughout, McShann's blend of swing, stride, boogie and blues is quite appealing". In JazzTimes Stanley Dance observed "McShann’s Piano, had wide circulation and served to introduce McShann as the singer he necessarily became in order to answer requests for the unforgotten hits with Walter Brown. He has a similar regional accent and vocal quality, but he sings much better than Brown, with more attention to melodic variety and more warmth and humor".

Track listing
All compositions by Jay McShann except where noted
 "Vine Street Boogie" – 4:30
 "The Staggers" (Bobby Black) – 3:00
 "Yardbird Waltz" – 2:28
 "My Chile" – 3:36
 "Confessin' the Blues" (Jay McShann, Walter Brown) – 2:14
 "Moten Swing" (Bennie Moten, Buster Moten) – 2:55
 "The Man from Muskogee" – 4:18
 "Blues for an Old Cat" (Black) – 2:36
 "I Ain't Mad at You" (Jesse Price, Bob Sparkler) – 3:07
 "Doo Wah Doo" (McShann, W. R. Dixon) – 2:36
 "Dexter Blues" (McShann, Willie Scott) – 3:20

Personnel
Jay McShann – piano, vocals
Chuck Norris – electric guitar
Ralph Hamilton – electric bass
Paul Gunther / Jesse Price – drums

References

1967 albums
Jay McShann albums
Capitol Records albums

Albums recorded at Capitol Studios